A smooth, more deeply concave depression on the lacrimal bone, which forms the medial wall of the orbital cavity, in which the lacrimal sac that drains into the nasolacrimal duct is located, is referred to as the lacrimal fossa (or fossa for the lacrimal sac).

See also
 Fossa for lacrimal gland

References 

Bones of the head and neck